Festival Peachtree Latino is an ethnic festival held annually Piedmont Park in Atlanta, Georgia. The festival, which celebrates Hispanic-American culture, is the largest multicultural event in the entire Southeast. The festival features arts and crafts, family activities, sporting events, a parade, dance demonstrations, ethnic foods, and a live music stage featuring international performers from Mexico, Puerto Rico, Colombia, Venezuela, and the Dominican Republic. In addition, over 250 exhibitors present favorite brands, souvenirs and interactive displays. The festival, which began in 2000, continues to grow in attendance. It is free and open to the public.

This festival went on hiatus in 2020.

References

External links
 Festival Peachtree Latino

See also
Culture of Atlanta
Tourism in Atlanta

Festivals in Atlanta
Cultural festivals in the United States
Hispanic and Latino American culture in Georgia (U.S. state)
Latin American festivals